Uralsvyazinform is one of the former 7 RTO's, or regional telecommunications operators, formed by the company Svyazinvest.  The company serves the Urals Federal District and the Perm Krai.

Uralsvyazinform's stock was traded on the RTS and MICEX stock exchanges.

Uralsvyazinform became part of Rostelecom on April 1, 2011, together with the seven other Svyazinvest regional telecommunications operators and OJSC Dagsvyazinform.

External links
Uralsvyazinform - English language and Russian language
Svyazinvest - English language and Russian language
Rostelecom - English language and Russian language

Mobile phone companies of Russia
Internet service providers of Russia
Cable television companies of Russia
Svyazinvest
Companies based in Yekaterinburg
Companies formerly listed on the Moscow Exchange
Defunct companies of Russia
Russian companies established in 1992
2011 disestablishments in Russia